CTI Consultants, Inc. (CTI) (rebranded as Stevenson Consulting), founded in 1984, is an engineering consulting firm with its corporate headquarters in Richmond, Virginia, and branch offices at eight other locations in the Mid-Atlantic Region of the United States – Baltimore, Maryland, Rockville, Maryland, Chantilly, Virginia, Ashland, Virginia, Charlottesville, Virginia, Winchester, Virginia, Norfolk, Virginia, Blacksburg, Virginia, and Raleigh, North Carolina.

Projects undertaken include bridges and highways, new buildings, additions, renovations and historical renovations as well as associated infrastructure.

History 
CTI was founded by Chris Stevenson in 1984 in Fairfax, Virginia. As of 2017, Chris Stevenson is the company's CEO, Colin Stevenson (son of Chris Stevenson) is president. In 1996, the company acquired the geotechnical engineering division of Hatcher-Sayre, Inc.

In 2008, CTI began working on federal government projects on military bases. In June 2017, the company acquired Mosher Engineering.

CTI has been recognized in the Mid Atlantic Engineering Industry via the Washington Business Journal's annual list of “Top 25 Engineering Firms” for the Washington Metropolitan Area.

Project examples include the Woodrow Wilson Bridge Expansion, The Westin Virginia Beach Town Center, the I-495 Hotlanes Expansion, United States Institute of Peace Headquarters, Square 54 Redevelopment, and The HRT Norfolk Tide Light Rail.

CTI is a contract holder for the Virginia Department of General Services.

References

External links 
CTI homepage
Rebranded homepage

Construction and civil engineering companies of the United States
Companies based in Richmond, Virginia
American companies established in 1984
Construction and civil engineering companies established in 1984
1984 establishments in Virginia